Single Ladies may refer to:

 "Single Ladies (Put a Ring on It)", a song by Beyoncé
 Single Ladies (TV series), an American television series on the VH1 network
 "Single Ladies", a song by Remady and Manu-L, featuring J-Son

See also 

 "Single Women", a song by Dolly Parton
 Ladies singles (disambiguation)
 A Single Woman (disambiguation)
 Bachelorette (disambiguation)